Brdo Castle may refer to:

Brdo Castle near Kranj, a mansion and estate in northwestern Slovenia
Brdo pri Lukovici#Castle, a mansion in central Slovenia